George Rogers Clark (November 19, 1752 – February 13, 1818) was an American military officer and surveyor from Virginia who became the highest-ranking Patriot military officer on the northwestern frontier during the Revolutionary War. He served as leader of the Virginia militia in Kentucky (then part of Virginia) throughout much of the war. He is best known for his captures of Kaskaskia in 1778 and Vincennes in 1779 during the Illinois campaign, which greatly weakened British influence in the Northwest Territory and earned Clark the nickname of "Conqueror of the Old Northwest". The British ceded the entire Northwest Territory to the United States in the 1783 Treaty of Paris. 

Clark's major military achievements occurred before his thirtieth birthday. Afterward, he led militia forces in the opening engagements of the Northwest Indian War, but was accused of being drunk on duty. He was disgraced and forced to resign, despite his demand for a formal investigation into the accusations. Clark left Kentucky to live in the Indiana Territory but was never fully reimbursed by the Virginian government for his wartime expenditures. During the final decades of his life, he worked to evade creditors and suffered living in increasing poverty and obscurity. He was involved in two failed attempts to open the Spanish-controlled Mississippi River to American traffic. After suffering a stroke and the amputation of his right leg, he became disabled. Clark was aided in his final years by family members, including his younger brother William, one of the leaders of the Lewis and Clark Expedition. He died of a stroke on February 13, 1818.

Early life
George Rogers Clark was born on November 19, 1752 in Albemarle County, Virginia, near Charlottesville, the hometown of Thomas Jefferson. He was the second of ten children borne by John and Ann Rogers Clark, who were Anglicans of English and possibly Scottish descent. Five of their six sons became officers during the American Revolutionary War. Their youngest son William was too young to fight in the war, but he later became famous as a leader of the Lewis and Clark Expedition. The family moved from the frontier to Caroline County, Virginia in 1756 after the outbreak of the French and Indian War.

Clark had little formal education. He lived with his grandfather so that he could receive a common education at Donald Robertson's school, where fellow students included James Madison and John Taylor of Caroline. He was also tutored at home, as was usual for the children of Virginia planters in this period. There was no public education. His grandfather trained him to be a surveyor.

In 1771 at age 19, Clark left his home on his first surveying trip into western Virginia. In 1772, he made his first foray into Kentucky via the Ohio River at Pittsburgh and spent the next two years surveying the Kanawha River region, as well as learning about the area's natural history and customs of the various tribes of Indians who lived there. In the meantime, thousands of settlers were entering the area as a result of the Treaty of Fort Stanwix of 1768, by which some of the tribes had agreed to peace.

Clark's military career began in 1774, when he served as a captain in the Virginia militia. He was preparing to lead an expedition of 90 men down the Ohio River when hostilities broke out between the Shawnee and settlers on the Kanawha frontier; this conflict eventually culminated in Lord Dunmore's War. Most of Kentucky was not inhabited by Indians, although such tribes as the Shawnee, Cherokee, and Seneca (of the Iroquois Confederacy) used the area for hunting. Tribes in the Ohio country who had not been party to the treaty signed with the Cherokee were angry, because the Kentucky hunting grounds had been ceded without their approval. As a result, they tried to resist encroachment by the American settlers, but were unsuccessful. Clark spent a few months surveying in Kentucky, as well as assisting in organizing Kentucky as a county for Virginia prior to the American Revolutionary War.

Revolutionary War
As the American Revolutionary War began in the East, Kentucky's settlers became involved in a dispute about the region's sovereignty. Richard Henderson, a judge and land speculator from North Carolina, had purchased much of Kentucky from the Cherokee by an illegal treaty. Henderson intended to create a proprietary colony known as Transylvania, but many Kentucky settlers did not recognize Transylvania's authority over them. In June 1776, these settlers selected Clark and John Gabriel Jones to deliver a petition to the Virginia General Assembly, asking Virginia to formally extend its boundaries to include Kentucky.

Clark and Jones traveled the Wilderness Road to Williamsburg, where they convinced Governor Patrick Henry to create Kentucky County, Virginia. Clark was given  of gunpowder to help defend the settlements and was appointed a major in the Kentucky County militia. Although he was only 24 years old, older settlers such as Daniel Boone, Benjamin Logan, and Leonard Helm considered him a leader.

Illinois campaign

In 1777, the Revolutionary War intensified in Kentucky. Lieutenant-governor Henry Hamilton, based at Fort Detroit, provided weapons to his Indian allies, supporting their raids on settlers in hope of reclaiming their lands. The Continental Army could spare no men for an invasion in the northwest or for the defense of Kentucky, which was left entirely to the local population. Clark spent several months defending settlements against the Indian raiders as a leader in the Kentucky County militia, while developing his plan for a long-distance strike against the British. His strategy involved seizing British outposts north of the Ohio River to destroy British influence among their Indian allies.

In December 1777, Clark presented his plan to Virginia's Governor Patrick Henry, and he asked for permission to lead a secret expedition to capture the British-held villages at Kaskaskia, Cahokia, and Vincennes in the Illinois country. Governor Henry commissioned him as a lieutenant colonel in the Virginia militia and authorized him to raise troops for the expedition. Clark and his officers recruited volunteers from Pennsylvania, Virginia, and North Carolina. Clark arrived at Redstone, a settlement on the Monongahela River south of Fort Pitt on February 1, where he made preparations for the expedition over the next several months. The men gathered at Redstone and the regiment departed from there on May 12, proceeding on boats down the Monongahela to Fort Pitt to take on supplies and then down the Ohio to Fort Henry and on to Fort Randolph at the mouth of the Kanawha. They reached the Falls of the Ohio in early June where they spent about a month along the Ohio River preparing for their secret mission.

In July 1778, Clark led the Illinois Regiment of the Virginia militia of about 175 men and crossed the Ohio River at Fort Massac and marched to Kaskaskia, capturing it on the night of July 4 without firing their weapons. The next day, Captain Joseph Bowman and his company captured Cahokia in a similar fashion without firing a shot. The garrison at Vincennes along the Wabash River surrendered to Clark in August. Several other villages and British forts were subsequently captured, after British hopes of local support failed to materialize. To counter Clark's advance, Hamilton recaptured the garrison at Vincennes, which the British called Fort Sackville, with a small force in December 1778.

Prior to initiating a march on Fort Detroit, Clark used his own resources and borrowed from his friends to continue his campaign after the initial appropriation had been depleted from the Virginia legislature. He re-enlisted some of his troops and recruited additional men to join him. Hamilton waited for spring to begin a campaign to retake the forts at Kaskaskia and Cahokia, but Clark planned another surprise attack on Fort Sackville at Vincennes. He left Kaskaskia on February 6, 1779, with about 170 men, beginning an arduous overland trek, encountering melting snow, ice, and cold rain along the journey. They arrived at Vincennes on February 23 and besieged Fort Sackville. After a siege which included the killing of 5 captive Indians on Clark's orders to intimidate the British, Hamilton surrendered the garrison on February 25 and was captured in the process. The winter expedition was Clark's most significant military achievement and became the basis of his reputation as an early American military hero.

News of Clark's victory reached General George Washington, and his success was celebrated and was used to encourage the alliance with France. General Washington recognized that Clark's achievement had been gained without support from the regular army, either in men or funds. Virginia also capitalized on Clark's success, laying claim to the Old Northwest by calling it Illinois County, Virginia.

Final years of the war
Clark's ultimate goal during the Revolutionary War was to seize the British-held fort at Detroit, but he could never recruit enough men and acquire sufficient munitions to make the attempt. Kentucky militiamen generally preferred to defend their own territory and stay closer to home, rather than make the long and potentially perilous expedition to Detroit. Clark returned to the Falls of the Ohio and Louisville, Kentucky, where he continued to defend the Ohio River valley until the end of the war.

In June 1780, a mixed British-Indian force, including Shawnee, Lenape and Wyandot warriors, set out from Fort Detroit and invaded Kentucky. They captured two fortified settlements and seized hundreds of prisoners. In August 1780, Clark led a retaliatory force that defeated the Shawnee at the village of Peckuwe. It has been commemorated as George Rogers Clark Park near Springfield, Ohio.

In 1781, Virginia Governor Thomas Jefferson promoted Clark to brigadier general and gave him command of all the militia in the Kentucky and Illinois counties. As Clark prepared to lead another expedition against the British and their allies in Detroit, General Washington transferred a small group of regulars to assist, but the detachment was disastrously defeated in August 1781 before they could meet up with Clark. This ended the western campaign.

In August 1782, another British-Indian force defeated the Kentucky militia at the Battle of Blue Licks. Clark was the militia's senior military officer, but he had not been present at the battle and was severely criticized in the Virginia Council for the disaster. In response November 1782, Clark led another expedition  into the Ohio country, destroying several Indian villages along the Great Miami River, including the Shawnee village of Piqua, Miami County, Ohio. This was the last major expedition of the war.

The importance of Clark's activities during the Revolutionary War has been the subject of much debate among historians. As early as 1779 George Mason called Clark the "Conqueror of the Northwest." Because the British ceded the entire Old Northwest Territory to the United States in the Treaty of Paris, some historians, including William Hayden English, credit Clark with nearly doubling the size of the original thirteen colonies when he seized control of the Illinois country during the war. Clark's Illinois campaign—particularly the surprise march to Vincennes—was greatly celebrated and romanticized.

More recent scholarship from historians such as Lowell Harrison has downplayed the importance of the campaign in the peace negotiations and the outcome of the war, arguing that Clark's "conquest" was little more than a temporary occupation of territory. Although the Illinois campaign is frequently described in terms of a harsh, winter ordeal for the Americans, James Fischer points out that the capture of Kaskaskia and Vincennes may not have been as difficult as previously suggested. Kaskaskia proved to be an easy target; Clark had sent two spies there in June 1777, who reported "an absence of soldiers in the town."

Clark's men also easily captured Vincennes and Fort Sackville. Prior to their arrival in 1778, Clark had sent Captain Leonard Helm to Vincennes to gather intelligence. In addition, Father Pierre Gibault, a local priest, helped persuade the town's inhabitants to side with the Americans. Before Clark and his men set out to recapture Vincennes in 1779, Francis Vigo provided Clark with additional information on the town, its surrounding area, and the fort. Clark was already aware of the fort's military strength, poor location (surrounded by houses that could provide cover to attackers), and dilapidated condition. Clark's strategy of a surprise attack and strong intelligence were critical in catching Hamilton and his men unaware and vulnerable. After killing  five captive Indians by hatchet within view of the fort, Clark forced its surrender.

Later years

In 1783, Clark, who "had a reputation as an Indian hater" and once declared that he would like to see "the whole race of Indians extirpated, that for his part he would never spare Man woman or child of them on whom he could lay his hands", publicly proposed that a 2,000-strong force be mustered in Virginia to attack Native Americans in the Ohio Valley. Clark argued that this proposed expedition would show "that [the United States] are always able to crush [Native Americans] at our pleasure". He also once told Native Americans that if they declared war on the United States, they "should know that the next thing would be the Tomahawk" with "Your Women & Children given to the Dogs to eat". The proposed expedition was never carried out due to budgetary concerns.

After Clark's victories in the Illinois country, settlers continued to pour into Kentucky and spread into and develop the land north of the Ohio River. On December 17, 1783, was Clark appointed Principal Surveyor of Bounty Lands. From 1784 to 1788 Clark served as the superintendent-surveyor for Virginia's war veterans, surveying lands granted to them for their service in the war. The position brought Clark a small income, but he devoted very little time to the enterprise.

In 1785 Clark helped to negotiate the Treaty of Fort McIntosh and the Treaty of Fort Finney in 1786, but the violence between Native Americans and European-American settlers continued to escalate. According to a 1790 U.S. government report, 1,500 Kentucky settlers had been killed in Indian raids since the end of the Revolutionary War. In an attempt to end the raids, Clark led an expedition of 1,200 drafted men against Native American villages along the Wabash River in 1786. The campaign, one of the first actions of the Northwest Indian War, ended without a victory. After approximately three hundred militiamen mutinied due to a lack of supplies, Clark had to withdraw, but not before concluding a ceasefire with the native tribes. It was rumored, most notably by James Wilkinson, that Clark had often been drunk on duty. When Clark learned of the accusations, he demanded an official inquiry, but the Virginia governor declined his request and Virginia Council condemned Clark's actions. With Clark's reputation tarnished, he never again led men in battle. Clark left Kentucky and moved across the Ohio River to the Indiana frontier, near present-day Clarksville, Indiana.

Life in Indiana
Following his military service, and especially after 1787, Clark spent much of the remainder of his life dealing with financial difficulties. Clark had financed the majority of his military campaigns with borrowed funds. When creditors began pressuring him to repay his debts, Clark was unable to obtain reimbursement from Virginia or the United States Congress. Due to haphazard record keeping on the frontier during the war, Virginia refused payment, claiming that Clark's receipts for his purchases were "fraudulent".

Clark's Grant and his other holdings gave Clark ownership of land that encompassed present-day Clark County, Indiana, and portions of adjoining Floyd and Scott Counties. Although Clark had claims to tens of thousands of acres of land, the result of his military service and land speculation, he was "land-poor," meaning that he owned much land but lacked the resources to develop it. George Rogers Clark's Receipts were discovered in the Richmond Virginia's Auditors building,in the early Nineteen hundreds  and that his records keeping efforts were Complete and correct but not reimbursed due to the State of Virginia's incompetencies, thus GRC WAS fully exhonerated in truth but not officially.e his memoirs around 1791, but they were not published during his lifetime. Although the autobiography contains factual inaccuracies, the work includes Clark's perspective on the events of his life. Some historians believe Clark wrote his memoirs in attempt to salvage his damaged reputation and to document his contributions during the Revolutionary War.

In the service of the French

On February 2, 1793, with his career seemingly over and his prospects for prosperity doubtful, Clark offered his services to Edmond-Charles Genêt, the controversial ambassador of revolutionary France, hoping to earn money to maintain his estate. Many Americans were outraged that the Spanish, who controlled Louisiana, denied Americans free access to the Mississippi River, their only easy outlet for long-distance commerce. The Washington administration was also unresponsive to western matters.

Genêt appointed Clark "Major General in the Armies of France and Commander-in-chief of the French Revolutionary Legion on the Mississippi River". Clark began to organize a campaign to seize New Madrid, St. Louis, Natchez, and New Orleans, getting assistance from old comrades such as Benjamin Logan and John Montgomery, and winning the tacit support of Kentucky governor Isaac Shelby. Clark spent $4,680 of his own money for supplies.

In early 1794, however, President Washington issued a proclamation forbidding Americans from violating U.S. neutrality and threatened to dispatch General Anthony Wayne to Fort Massac to stop the expedition. The French government recalled Genêt and revoked the commissions he granted to the Americans for the war against Spain. Clark's planned campaign gradually collapsed, and he was unable to convince the French to reimburse him for his expenses. Clark's reputation, already damaged by earlier accusations at the end of the Revolutionary War, was further maligned as a result of his involvement in these foreign intrigues.

Mounting debts

In his later years Clark's mounting debts made it impossible for him to retain ownership of his land, since it became subject to seizure due to his debts. Clark deeded much of his land to friends or transferred ownership to family members so his creditors could not seize it. Lenders and their assignees eventually deprived the veteran of nearly all of the property that remained in his name. Clark, who was at one time the largest landholder in the Northwest Territory, was left with only a small plot of land in Clarksville. In 1803 Clark built a cabin overlooking the Falls of the Ohio, where he lived until his health failed in 1809. He also purchased a small gristmill, which Clark operated with two slaves he owned.

Clark's knowledge of the region helped him to become an expert on the West's natural history. Over the years he welcomed travelers, including those interested in natural history, to his home overlooking the Ohio River. Clark supplied details on the area's plant and animal life to John Pope and John James Audubon, and hosted his brother, William, and Meriweather Lewis, prior to their expedition to the Pacific Northwest. Clark also provided information on the Ohio Valley's native tribes to Allan Bowie Magruder and archaeological evidence related to the Mound Builders to John P. Campbell.

In later life Clark continued to struggle with alcohol abuse, a problem which had plagued him on-and-off for many years. He also remained bitter about his treatment and neglect by Virginia, and blamed it for his financial misfortune.

When the Indiana Territory chartered the Indiana Canal Company in 1805 to build a canal around the Falls of the Ohio, near Clarksville, Clark was named to the board of directors. He became part of the surveying team that assisted in laying out the route of the canal. The company collapsed the next year before construction could begin, when two of the fellow board members, including Vice President Aaron Burr, were arrested for treason. A large part of the company's $1.2 million (equivalent to $ million in ) in investments was unaccounted for; its location was never determined.

Return to Kentucky
Alcoholism and poor health affected Clark during his final years. In 1809 he suffered a severe stroke. When he fell into a burning fireplace, he suffered a burn on his right leg that was so severe it had to be amputated. The injury made it impossible for Clark to continue to operate his mill and live independently. As a result, he moved to Locust Grove, a farm eight miles (13 km) from the growing town of Louisville, and became a member of the household of his sister, Lucy, and brother-in-law, Major William Croghan, a planter.

In 1812 the Virginia General Assembly granted Clark a pension of four hundred dollars per year and finally recognized his services in the Revolutionary War by presenting him with a ceremonial sword.

Death and legacy

After another stroke, Clark died at Locust Grove on February 13, 1818; he was buried at Locust Grove Cemetery two days later. Clark's remains were exhumed along with those of his other family members on October 29, 1869, and buried at Cave Hill Cemetery in Louisville.

In his funeral oration, Judge John Rowan succinctly summed up Clark's stature and importance during the critical years on the trans-Appalachian frontier: "The mighty oak of the forest has fallen, and now the scrub oaks sprout all around." Clark's career was closely tied to events in the Ohio-Mississippi Valley at a pivotal time when the region was inhabited by numerous Native American tribes and claimed by the British, Spanish, and French, as well as the fledgling U.S. government. As a member of the Virginia militia, and with Virginia's support, Clark's campaign into the Illinois country helped strengthen Virginia's claim on lands in the region as it came under the control of the Americans. Clark's military service in the interior of North America also helped him became an "important source of leadership and information (although not necessarily accurate) on the West."

Clark is best known as a war hero of the Revolutionary War in the West, especially as the leader of the secret expeditionary forces that captured Kaskaskia, Cahokia, and Vincennes in 1778–79. Some historians have suggested that the campaign supported American claims to the Northwest Territory during negotiations that resulted in the Treaty of Paris (1783). Clark's Grant, the large tract of land on the north side of the Ohio River that he received as compensation for his military service, included a large portion of Clark County, Indiana, and portions of Floyd and Scott Counties, as well as the present-day site of Clarksville, Indiana, the first American town laid out in the Northwest Territory (in 1784). Clark served as the first chairman of the Clarksville, Indiana, board of trustees. Clark was unable to retain title to his landholdings. At the end of his life, he was poor, in ill health, and frequently intoxicated.

Several years after Clark's death the government of Virginia granted his estate $30,000 as a partial payment on the debts it owed him. The Virginian government continued to repay Clark for decades; the last payment to his estate was made in 1913. Clark never married and he kept no account of any romantic relationships, although his family held that he had once been in love with Teresa de Leyba, sister of Fernando de Leyba, the lieutenant governor of Spanish Louisiana. Writings from his niece and cousin in the Draper Manuscripts in the archives of the Wisconsin Historical Society attest to their belief in Clark's lifelong disappointment over the failed romance.

Honors and tributes
 On May 23, 1928, President Calvin Coolidge ordered a memorial to Clark to be erected at Vincennes, Indiana. Completed in 1933, the George Rogers Clark Memorial was dedicated on June 14, 1936, by President Franklin D. Roosevelt. The Roman-style temple was erected on what was believed to have been the site of Fort Sackville. The site, now called the George Rogers Clark National Historical Park, became a part of the National Park Service in 1966. Hermon Atkins MacNeil created the monument's  bronze statue of Clark. The monument's walls include seven murals depicting Clark's famous expedition.
 On February 25, 1929, to commemorate the 150th anniversary of the surrender of Fort Sackville, the U.S. Postal Service issued a two-cent postage stamp depicting the event.
 In 1975 the Indiana General Assembly designated February 25 as George Rogers Clark Day in Indiana.
 In 1979 Indiana's automobile license plates commemorated the 200th anniversary of Clark's capture of Fort Sackville.
 A bronze statue of Clark is one of several erected on Monument Circle, surrounding the Soldiers' and Sailors' Monument, in downtown Indianapolis, Indiana. Sculptor John H. Mahoney received the commission to create the statue, which was completed in 1895.
 The Daughters of the American Revolution placed a statue by sculptor Leon Hermant at Metropolis, the site of Fort Massac, in Massac County, Illinois, in the early 1900s.
 Sculptor Felix de Weldon created the Clark statue at Riverfront Plaza/Belvedere, next to the wharf on the Ohio River, in Louisville, Kentucky.
  Charles Keck created the memorial statue of Clark at the site of the Battle of Piqua, near Springfield, Ohio.
 Robert Aitken's bronze sculpture of Clark was erected on Monument Square, on the grounds of the University of Virginia at Charlottesville, Virginia, in 1921. It was removed by the University of Virginia in July 2021, after it was deemed offensive in its portrayal of Native Americans and its removal was recommended by a racial equity task force.
 A Clark statue was erected in Riverview Park, on the eastern bank of the Mississippi River at Quincy, Illinois, in 1909.
 In April 1929, the Paul Revere Chapter of the Daughters of the American Revolution of Muncie, Indiana, erected a monument to Clark on Washington Avenue in Fredericksburg, Virginia. Clark spent his childhood in southwestern Caroline County, about 40 miles from Fredericksburg.
 Clark is the namesake of a number of counties in the United States: Clark County, Illinois; Clark County, Indiana; Clark County, Kentucky; Clark County, Ohio;  Clarke County, Virginia; and Clark County, Wisconsin.
 Several communities in the U.S. have been named in his honor: Clarksville, Indiana; Clarksville, Tennessee; and Clarksburg, West Virginia.
 Schools named in Clark's honor include:
 George Rogers Clark Elementary School of Chicago, Illinois.
 George Rogers Clark Elementary School, Clarksville, Indiana (closed 2010)
 George Rogers Clark College, Indianapolis, Indiana (closed 1992)
 George Rogers Clark Middle School, Vincennes, Indiana
 George Rogers Clark Junior High School, Springfield, Ohio (now closed)
 George Rogers Clark Middle/High School, Whiting, Lake County, Indiana (school closing following the 2020–21 school year)
 George Rogers Clark Elementary School, Paducah, Kentucky
 George Rogers Clark High School, Winchester, Clark County, Kentucky
 George Rogers Clark Elementary School, Charlottesville, Virginia
 Other sites and structures:
 The George Rogers Clark Memorial Bridge (Second Street Bridge), built in 1929, carries U.S. Highway 31 over the Ohio River at Louisville, Kentucky.
 In 1979 the Indiana American Revolution Bicentennial Commission and the Indiana Highway Commission erected an estimated 600 signs to establish the George Rogers Clark Trail, marking the routes used by Clark and his men in Indiana during the Revolutionary War.
 Clark Street in Chicago, is named in his honor.
 The Liberty Ship SS George Rogers Clark. Launched 9 November 1942; Commissioned 2 January 1943; Sold private 1947, scrapped 1963.

See also

 History of Louisville, Kentucky
 List of people from the Louisville metropolitan area
 George Rogers Clark Flag
 Old Clarksville Site
 George Rogers Clark (1985 bust)

Notes

Bibliography

Further reading

External links

 Patrick Henry's Secret Orders to Clark, dated January 2, 1778 – Indiana Historical Society
 The George Rogers Clark Heritage Association 
 
 Indiana Territory, Indiana Historical Bureau
 George Rogers Clark Memoir , Indiana Historical Bureau
 Clark Family Papers  – Missouri History Museum Archives
 
 "The Clarks: The First Family of the Frontier," 8thVirginia.com.
 
Guide to the Reuben T. Durrett Collection of George Rogers Clark Papers 1776-1896 at the University of Chicago Special Collections Research Center 

1752 births
1818 deaths
American people of the Northwest Indian War
Burials at Cave Hill Cemetery
Clark County, Ohio
Clarksburg, West Virginia
Clarksville, Indiana
American people of English descent
American amputees
History of Louisville, Kentucky
Illinois in the American Revolution
Indiana in the American Revolution
Kentucky militiamen in the American Revolution
Militia generals in the American Revolution
American mercenaries
American filibusters (military)
Military personnel from Louisville, Kentucky
People in Dunmore's War
American slave owners
American explorers
Kentucky pioneers
People of Virginia in the American Revolution
People of Kentucky in the American Revolution
People from Clark County, Indiana
American people of Scottish descent
Virginia colonial people
18th-century Anglicans
American Anglicans
American surveyors
American naturalists
Scientists with disabilities